George-Frédéric-Théophile Baillairgé (16 October 1824 – 7 December 1909) was from a
family that traced its distinguished roots in Lower Canada to Jean Baillairgé. He had a good education, was fluently bilingual and then studied law for a year before deciding on a different career path. 

Frédéric became a civil servant in 1844, taking a drafting position with the Board of Works, working as an assistant to 
Frederick Preston Rubidge. He was to be in public works for 46 years. He quickly became a land surveyor and took on translation responsibilities. He wrote extensively for this position, compiling important details of public works history.

As his engineering career progressed he was involved in numerous and diverse public works projects including a number designed by his brother,  Charles.

His career is a testament to his technical expertise and the importance of public works in building the prosperity of the country during that era.

Works

References 

 

Canadian engineers
1824 births
1909 deaths
People from Quebec City